The 2017 Shropshire Council election took place on 4 May 2017 as part of the 2017 local elections in the United Kingdom. All 74 councillors were elected from 63 electoral divisions which return either one, two or three councillors each by first-past-the-post voting for a four-year term of office.

Results

Summary

|-
| 
| Federalist Party of the United Kingdom
| align="right"| 
| align="right"| 
| align="right"| 
| align="right"| 
| align="right"| 
| align="right"| 0.08
| align="right"| 79 
| align="right"| 
|-

All wards are single seat unless otherwise stated

The results below are sourced from the Shropshire Council website.

Abbey

Albrighton

Alveley and Claverley

Bagley

Battlefield

Bayston Hill, Column and Sutton

Belle Vue

Bishop's Castle

Bowbrook

Bridgnorth East and Astley Abbotts

Bridgnorth West and Tasley

Broseley

Brown Clee

Burnell

Castlefields and Ditherington

Cheswardine

Chirbury and Worthen

Church Stretton and Craven Arms

Clee

Cleobury Mortimer

Clun

Copthorne

Corvedale

Ellesmere Urban

Gobowen, Selattyn and Weston Rhyn

Harlescott

Highley

Hodnet

Llanymynech

Longden

Loton

Ludlow East

Ludlow North

Ludlow South

Market Drayton East

Market Drayton West

Meole

Monkmoor

Much Wenlock

Oswestry East

Oswestry South

Oswestry West

Porthill

Prees

Quarry and Coton Hill

Radbrook

Rea Valley

Ruyton and Baschurch

Severn Valley

Shawbury

Shifnal North

Shifnal South and Cosford

St Martin's

St Oswald

Sundorne

Tern

The Meres

Underdale

Wem

Whitchurch North

Whitchurch South

Whittington

Worfield

References

2017
2017 English local elections
21st century in Shropshire